Alcock Tarn is a lake in South Lakeland, Cumbria, England. It is located high in the fells on Heron Pike, roughly a mile and a half east of Grasmere.

The owner, a Mr Alcock of Grasmere, then stocked it with brown trout.

References

Lakes of the Lake District
South Lakeland District